Cocolamus Creek is a  tributary of the Juniata River in Juniata and Perry counties, Pennsylvania in the United States.

Cocolamus Creek joins the Juniata River approximately 0.9 mile (1.4 km) downstream of the borough of Millerstown, approximately 16.5 miles (27 km) upstream of the Susquehanna River.

Bridges
 The Dimmsville Covered Bridge crosses Cocolamus Creek at Greenwood Township, Pennsylvania.

See also
List of rivers of Pennsylvania

References

Rivers of Pennsylvania
Tributaries of the Juniata River
Rivers of Juniata County, Pennsylvania
Rivers of Perry County, Pennsylvania